The Mkhitar Heratsi Yerevan State Medical University (YSMU), is an Armenian medical university located in Yerevan, Armenia.

History
On 31 January 1920, during the First Republic of Armenia, the People's University of Armenia opened in Alexandropol, with the presence of prime minister Alexander Khatisian and minister of culture and public education Nikol Aghbalian. In October of the same year, a decision was passed by then-minister of education Gevorg Ghazarian to establish the faculty of medicine in the university. However, due to political circumstances, the plan was never fulfilled. Armenia became a republic in December 1920.

In 1920, the medical faculty of Yerevan was founded by the government of Armenia.

On 25 May 1989 Yerevan State Medical University was named after the 12th-century Armenian physician Mkhitar Heratsi.

Campuses and hospitals 

The Medical University's campus is located in the center of the city on Koryun street. It is home to the following buildings:
Main university building 
Administrative building
Laboratory building
Anatomical building
Dental clinics building

Two hospitals operate under the jurisdiction of the Yerevan Medical University, where students complete practical experience. The Heratsi Hospital Complex No.1 is located near the university complex, while the Muratsan Hospital Complex is located in the Erebuni District of Yerevan.

Organization and administration  
The management of the Yerevan State Medical University is carried out according to legislation of the Republic of Armenia and the Charter of the university, on the basis of self-governance, in conjunction with the principles of sole management and collegiality.

The university's governing bodies are the council, the rector, the scientific council, and the rectorate. The council is composed of 32 members and is drawn from the university professoriate, students, representatives of the Armenian government, the Ministry of Education and Science. The primary objectives of the University Council are the selection of the university rector, the university's development as well as the major directions of international cooperation, with the rector's presentation. The Board also debates and approves the university budget.

Faculties
Currently, YSMU has seven faculties: 
 Faculty of General Medicine
 Faculty Stomatology
 Faculty of Pharmacy
 Faculty of Public Health
 Faculty of Military Medicine
 Professional and Continuing Education Centre
 Dean's Office of International Student's Education
The chair of each faculty is the dean; the faculty committees manage each of them. The dean reports to the vice-Rector, who in turn reports to the rector. The current rector is Armen Muradyan, and the chair of the board is Armen Ashotyan.

Academics

Programs 
The duration of the continuous and integrated educational program for bachelor's degree is six years in general medicine and military medical faculties and five years in the dental faculty. The duration of the Bachelor's Qualification Education Program is four years in the Faculty of Pharmacy.

Master's degree is offered in the following specializations:
 Medicine,
 Public Health and Health Care
 Pharmacy
 Medical work in the armed forces

Research 
Foundation's faculty has 689 employees with a scientific degree, including 165 doctors of sciences, 524 candidates. As of December 2016, 28 post-graduate students and 96 applicants implement research activities in the fund.

Cooperation and international relations   
Yerevan State Medical University has international membership in:
 Association of Dental Education in Europe (ADEE)
 International Association of Universities (IAU)
 International Federation of Medical Students Association (IFMSA)
 International Pharmaceutical Students Federation (IPSF)
 International Federation of Dental Students Association (IFDSA)
 SGroup European Universities' Network (SGroup)

It is also included in international educational and scientific program such as Tacis-Tempus and World Bank.

Libraries 
YSMU University Library has a collection of research and academic materials.

There is also an online library comprising study materials, tests, and questionnaire, which are available to both students and interested people.

Yerevan State Basic Medical College
The Yerevan State Basic Medical College is an intermediate technical college opened in 1996, operating under the administration of the Yerevan State Medical University. The college provides 2-year study programs in 5 fields:
Dental Laboratory Technician,
Medicine,
Pharmaceuticals,
Laboratory Diagnosis,
Nursing (female).

People

Students 
The university has more than 7000 students. 24% of these students are international students from 26 countries.

Faculty and staff 
The university has more than 1100 professors.

Honorary Doctor Award
YSMU's University Honorary Doctor Award was conferred to many remarkable and distinguished people. 
 Tom Catena, Doctor in Sudan's Nuba mountains, winner of Aurora prize  
 Princess Dina Mired of Jordan, director general of King Hussein Cancer Foundation (KHCF), the chairwoman of the Union of International Cancer Control, the Princess of Jordan
 Bhairon Singh Shekhawat, Indian former vice-president 
 Hagop Kantarjian, professor from the University of Texas MD Anderson Cancer Center
 Agop Bedikian, from the University of Texas MD Anderson Cancer Center 
 Aaron Ciechanover, Israeli biologist and winner of the Nobel prize in Chemistry 
 Klaus-Peter Hellriegel, chairman of the Berlin Cancer Society, secretary and board member of the German Society of Hematology and Oncology
 Nirmal K.Ganguly, president of the  Jawaharlal Institute of Post Graduate Medical Education
 Leo Bokeria, cardiologist, heart surgeon, professor, academician, Head of Bakulev Scientific Center of Cardiovascular Surgery, Russia
 Philippe Jeanty, scientist in the field of prenatal diagnosis, the founder of prenatal echocardiography 
 Edgar M. Housepian, neurosurgeon and professor 
 Levon Nazarian, professor and vice chairman of the Department of Radiology and the Residency Program Director at Thomas Jefferson University Hospital in Philadelphia
 Leonid Roshal, chairman of International Charity Fund to Help Children in Disasters and Wars,  expert for the World Health Organization

Alumni
Alumni of the university include:
 Ara Babloyan,  President of the National Assembly of Armenia
 Emil Gabrielian, Pharmacologist and Surgeon, Minister of Health of Armenian SSR
 Bella Qocharyan, the former First Lady of Armenia
 Ruben Jaghinyan, Chairman of the Council of Public TV and Radio Company of Armenia
 Vahan Artsruni, Armenian rock musician, singer, composer and artist 
 Garik Martirosyan, comedian, TV host, actor
 Bharath Reddy, Indian Film actor, cardiologist

References

External links 
 Yerevan State Medical University (YSMU)
 Yerevan State Medical University (YSMU)
 Armenian Medical Students' Parliament

 
Universities and institutes established in the Soviet Union
Education in Yerevan
Educational institutions established in 1920
1920 establishments in Armenia
Public medical universities